Goran Ivanišević was the defending champion and won in the final 6–2, 6–2 against Sergi Bruguera.

Seeds
A champion seed is indicated in bold text while text in italics indicates the round in which that seed was eliminated.

Draw

References

External links
 1997 Italian Indoor draw

Milan Indoor
Italian Indoor
Milan